Protolampra rufipectus, the red-breasted dart moth, is a species of cutworm or dart moth in the family Noctuidae. It is found in North America.

The MONA or Hodges number for Protolampra rufipectus is 11004.

References

Further reading

 
 
 

Noctuinae
Articles created by Qbugbot
Moths described in 1875